Glade Township is a township in Warren County, Pennsylvania, United States. The population was 2,045 at the 2020 census, down from 2,308 at the 2010 census. 2,319 at the 2000 census.

Geography

Demographics

At the 2000 census, there were 2,319 people, 961 households and 686 families residing in the township. The racial make-up was 98.58% White, 0.13% African American, 0.04% Native American, 0.91% Asian, 0.13% from other races, and 0.22% from two or more races. Hispanic or Latino of any race were 0.13% of the population.

There were 961 households, of which 27.1% had children under the age of 18 living with them, 62.1% were married couples living together, 5.6% had a female householder with no husband present, and 28.6% were non-families. 24.3% of all households were made up of individuals, and 10.1% had someone living alone who was 65 years of age or older. The average household size was 2.39 and the average family size was 2.84.

22.6% of the population were under the age of 18, 4.7% from 18 to 24, 25.4% from 25 to 44, 29.4% from 45 to 64, and 17.9% were 65 years of age or older. The median age was 44 years. For every 100 females, there were 98.7 males. For every 100 females age 18 and over, there were 96.8 males.

The median household income was $40,938 and the median family income was $55,667. Males had a median income of $38,472 and females $26,538. The per capita income was $24,839. About 1.7% of families and 3.8% of the population were below the poverty line, including 1.9% of those under age 18 and 6.6% of those age 65 or over.

References

Townships in Warren County, Pennsylvania
Townships in Pennsylvania